"Far from Home" is a song by American heavy metal band Five Finger Death Punch. It was released on September 16, 2010 as the sixth and final single from their second studio album War Is the Answer. It debuted at number 33 on the Billboard Mainstream Rock Songs chart, eventually peaking at number four. It debuted at number 45 on the Billboard Rock Songs chart and has peaked at number 14. It is one of Five Finger Death Punch's most well known songs.

The song was featured on episode 06x10 "What Happens at Home" of CBS's Criminal Minds.

Writing and recording
Guitarist Zoltan Bathory told Metal Hammer about the song's evolution: "We'd been kicking this song around for over a year, and we did record an early version of it, but somehow we couldn't quite get it to gel. That can happen with songs – you're not sure about them to start them, and then they grow into something special, which is really what happened with 'The Bleeding'… I mean, that only just scraped onto the first album!

"Then Kevin [Churko; producer] heard 'Far From Home', which is kind of a ballad I guess, and he encouraged us to work on it some more, and today of course I'm really glad we did. We changed the structure, added some strings, and generally moved the track up to a whole new level. "Now I would say it's a potential single, but quite a way down the line…"

Track listing

Charts

Weekly charts

Year-end charts

Personnel
 Ivan Moody – lead vocals
 Zoltan Bathory – rhythm guitar
 Jeremy Spencer – drums
 Jason Hook – lead guitar, backing vocals
 Matt Snell – bass

References

Five Finger Death Punch songs
2010 singles
Hard rock ballads
2009 songs
Song recordings produced by Kevin Churko
Songs written by Kevin Churko
Songs written by Zoltan Bathory
Songs written by Ivan Moody (vocalist)
Songs written by Jason Hook
Songs written by Jeremy Spencer (drummer)